Kamachal or Kama Chal or Koma Chal may refer to:
 Kamachal-e Bala Mahalleh
 Kamachal-e Pain Mahalleh